Rank insignia in the Irish Defence Forces are an indication of the wearer's military rank, and worn by officers and enlisted members of Ireland's Defence Forces as an element of their uniform, typically on a single chest tab or as a shoulder board.

Irish Army 
Officers

Other ranks

Historic ranks

Irish Air Corps 
Irish Air Corps rank insignia are an indication of the wearer's military rank, and worn by officers and enlisted members of the Irish Air Corps as an element of their uniform.

Officers

Other ranks

Irish Naval Service 
Officers

Enlisted

Naval reserve 
Prior to 2002 ranks for NCOs in the Naval Reserve were in blue instead of gold.

Notes

References

Bibliography

External links 
 

Defence Forces (Ireland) military insignia
Ireland and the Commonwealth of Nations
Ireland